Metropolitan State University of Denver is home to many projects, centers, and institutes.

Projects, Centers, and Institutes

Art
Center for Visual Art (CVA)
Colorado Folk Arts Council

Business and Trade
Center for Innovation

Education
2+2 Plan 
Alternative Licensure Program (ALP)
Center for Improving Early Learning - Tools of the Mind (CIEL)
Center for Individualized Learning
College Assistance Migrant Program 
Family Center
Family Literacy Program 
First Year Success Program
Center for Urban Education (CUE)
Honors Program
Internship Center
Student Academic Success Center (SASC)
TRiO High School Upward Bound
Veterans Upward Bound
Writing Center

Health
Counseling Center
Health Center at Auraria
Metro State Food Bank

History
Welcome to Camp Hale

Humanities
Language & Cultural Institute

Public Policy and Service
Center for Urban Connections (CUC)
The Golda Meir Center for Political Leadership (Golda)
Hispanic Leadership Development
Army ROTC

Regional Issues
Equity Assistance Center (EAC), Region VIII
Institute for Women's Studies & Services (IWSS)

Science
Center for Math, Science, and Environmental Education (CMSEE)
Surveying and Mapping Program
One World, One Water Center for Urban Water Education and Stewardship (OWOW Center)
Strides Towards Encouraging Professions in Science

See also 
 Metropolitan State University of Denver
 Auraria Campus

References

Metropolitan State University of Denver